Theopaschism is the belief that a god can suffer. Owing to controversies about the passion of Jesus and his divinity, this doctrine was a subject of ecumenical councils which affirmed the theopaschite formula.

Christology 

In Christian theology this involves questions such as "was the crucifixion of Jesus a crucifixion of God?" The question is central to the schism between those churches which accepted the First Council of Ephesus and the Assyrian Church of the East. While not Nestorian, the Assyrian Church of the East, along with their greatest teacher, Babai the Great, deny the possibility of a suffering God.

Modern philosophy 
A number of modern philosophers and theologians have been called theopaschists, such as G. W. F. Hegel, Friedrich Nietzsche and Simone Weil. Kazoh Kitamori's Theology of the Pain of God (1946) and Moltmann's The Crucified God (1971) are two 1900s books that have taken up the ancient theological idea that at least "one of the Trinity has suffered". In the words of Hans Urs von Balthasar:

Holy Spirit 
Some proponents of liberation theology have extended the theopaschist debate to the hypostasis of the Holy Spirit, questioning whether the Spirit may or may not have felt pain during the incarnation. This debate has had implications in ecclesiology, per Leonardo Boff's Church: Charism and Power.

See also 
 Dyophysitism
 Hypostatic union

References

Works cited 

  Translated from the German: 
 
  Translated from the Japanese: 
  Translated from the German: 
 ; DS 401.

Further reading 
 
 

Christian terminology
Nature of Jesus Christ